The 2011 CONCACAF Gold Cup is an official FIFA international football tournament to be held in United States from June 5 to June 25, 2011. The twelve national teams involved in the tournament are required to register a squad of 23 players, as stipulated in the CONCACAF Gold Cup Tournament Rules and Regulations; only players listed in these squads are eligible to take part in the tournament. Listed players may only be substituted in the event of a serious injury up until 24 hours before the team's first match. The squads were submitted on May 21, 2011, 15 days prior to the first game.

Group A

Costa Rica
Head coach:  Ricardo La Volpe

Cuba
Head coach: Raúl González Triana

Yosniel Mesa defected to the United States

El Salvador
Head coach:  Rubén Israel

M/F: On September 20, 2013, the Salvadoran Football Federation banned 14 Salvadoran players banned for life due to their involvement with match fixing while playing with the El Salvador national team over the previous two years, including 2011 CONCACAF Gold Cup players Dennis Alas, Luis Anaya, Marvin González, Reynaldo Hernández, Miguel Montes, Dagoberto Portillo, Osael Romero, Ramón Sánchez and Miguel Montes.

Mexico
Head coach: José Manuel de la Torre

It was announced during the tournament on June 9, 2011, that five Mexican players, Sinha, Christian Bermúdez, Édgar Dueñas, Francisco Javier Rodríguez and Guillermo Ochoa, all tested positive for clenbuterol prior to the Gold Cup and have therefore been withdrawn from the squad. The CONCACAF Gold Cup Organizing Committee announced on June 19 that Mexico will be allowed to replace the suspended players. Mexico called up the following five players as replacements:

Group B

Guatemala
Head coach:  Ever Hugo Almeida

Grenada
Head coach:  Mike Adams

Honduras
Head coach:  Luis Fernando Suárez

Jamaica
Head coach: Theodore Whitmore

Group C

Canada
Head coach:  Stephen Hart

Guadeloupe
Head coach: Roger Salnot

Panama
Head coach: Julio Dely Valdés

United States
Head coach:  Bob Bradley

Player statistics
Player representation by club

Three or more players

Player representation by league

CONCACAF nations only

The Cuban squad was made up entirely of players from its domestic league.

References

CONCACAF Gold Cup squads
Squads